Yagati Suryanarayana Venkatesha Datta or Y. S. V. Datta (born 24 June 1954) is an Indian politician and former member of Karnataka Legislative Assembly from the Kadur seat in 2013 on the Janata Dal (Secular) ticket. Later on 14 January 2023, He joined Indian National Congress in the presence of leader of the opposition Siddaramaiah and Karnataka Pradesh Congress Committee president DK Shivakumar.

Early life and education
Y. Datta was born in Yagati, Kadur taluk, Chikmagalur district. He completed a B.Sc. From National College Basavanagudi in Bangalore in 1973. Before entering politics, he taught mathematics to SSLC, PUC, B.Sc. and engineering students through his tutorial in Bengaluru's Rajajinagar.

Political career

References

1954 births
Living people
Members of the Karnataka Legislative Council
Karnataka MLAs 2013–2018

Indian National Congress politicians from Karnataka
Janata Dal (Secular) politicians